Andrei Posnov (born 19 November 1981) is a professional ice hockey player who is currently playing for Vityaz Chekhov in the Kontinental Hockey League (KHL). He was selected by New Jersey Devils in the 4th round (128th overall) of the 2001 NHL Entry Draft.

Career statistics

External links

1981 births
Living people
Atlant Moscow Oblast players
HC Neftekhimik Nizhnekamsk players
HC Sibir Novosibirsk players
HC Spartak Moscow players
Krylya Sovetov Moscow players
New Jersey Devils draft picks
Russian ice hockey left wingers
SKA Saint Petersburg players
Torpedo Nizhny Novgorod players
HC Vityaz players
People from Vorkuta
Sportspeople from the Komi Republic